is a Japanese manga written and illustrated by Ako Yutenji. The manga is published in Shinshokan's Wings. The English-language release of manga has been licensed in North America by Tokyopop and a German-language release in Germany by Egmont Publishing.

References

External links

1997 manga
Adventure anime and manga
Shinshokan manga
Shōjo manga
Tokyopop titles